In graph theory, graph coloring is a special case of graph labeling; it is an assignment of labels traditionally called "colors" to elements of a graph subject to certain constraints. In its simplest form, it is a way of coloring the vertices of a graph such that no two adjacent vertices are of the same color; this is called a vertex coloring. Similarly, an edge coloring assigns a color to each edge so that no two adjacent edges are of the same color, and a face coloring of a planar graph assigns a color to each face or region so that no two faces that share a boundary have the same color.

Vertex coloring is often used to introduce graph coloring problems, since other coloring problems can be transformed into a vertex coloring instance. For example, an edge coloring of a graph is just a vertex coloring of its line graph, and a face coloring of a plane graph is just a vertex coloring of its dual. However, non-vertex coloring problems are often stated and studied as-is. This is partly pedagogical, and partly because some problems are best studied in their non-vertex form, as in the case of edge coloring.

The convention of using colors originates from coloring the countries of a map, where each face is literally colored. This was generalized to coloring the faces of a graph embedded in the plane. By planar duality it became coloring the vertices, and in this form it generalizes to all graphs. In mathematical and computer representations, it is typical to use the first few positive or non-negative integers as the "colors". In general, one can use any finite set as the "color set". The nature of the coloring problem depends on the number of colors but not on what they are.

Graph coloring enjoys many practical applications as well as theoretical challenges. Beside the classical types of problems, different limitations can also be set on the graph, or on the way a color is assigned, or even on the color itself. It has even reached popularity with the general public in the form of the popular number puzzle Sudoku. Graph coloring is still a very active field of research.

Note: Many terms used in this article are defined in Glossary of graph theory.

History

The first results about graph coloring deal almost exclusively with planar graphs in the form of the coloring of maps.
While trying to color a map of the counties of England, Francis Guthrie postulated the four color conjecture, noting that four colors were sufficient to color the map so that no regions sharing a common border received the same color. Guthrie's brother passed on the question to his mathematics teacher Augustus De Morgan at University College, who mentioned it in a letter to William Hamilton in 1852. Arthur Cayley raised the problem at a meeting of the London Mathematical Society in 1879. The same year, Alfred Kempe published a paper that claimed to establish the result, and for a decade the four color problem was considered solved. For his accomplishment Kempe was elected a Fellow of the Royal Society and later President of the London Mathematical Society.

In 1890, Heawood pointed out that Kempe's argument was wrong. However, in that paper he proved the five color theorem, saying that every planar map can be colored with no more than five colors, using ideas of Kempe. In the following century, a vast amount of work and theories were developed to reduce the number of colors to four,  until the four color theorem was finally proved in 1976 by Kenneth Appel and Wolfgang Haken. The proof went back to the ideas of Heawood and Kempe and largely disregarded the intervening developments. The proof of the four color theorem is also noteworthy for being the first major computer-aided proof.

In 1912, George David Birkhoff introduced the chromatic polynomial to study the coloring problems, which was generalised to the Tutte polynomial by Tutte, important structures in algebraic graph theory. Kempe had already drawn attention to the general, non-planar case in 1879, and many results on generalisations of planar graph coloring to surfaces of higher order followed in the early 20th century.

In 1960, Claude Berge formulated another conjecture about graph coloring, the strong perfect graph conjecture, originally motivated by an information-theoretic concept called the zero-error capacity of a graph introduced by Shannon. The conjecture remained unresolved for 40 years, until it was established as the celebrated strong perfect graph theorem by Chudnovsky, Robertson, Seymour, and Thomas in 2002.

One of the major applications of graph coloring,  register allocation in compilers, was introduced in 1981.

Definition and terminology

Vertex coloring

When used without any qualification, a coloring of a graph is almost always a proper vertex coloring, namely a labeling of the graph's vertices with colors such that no two vertices sharing the same edge have the same color. Since a vertex with a loop (i.e. a connection directly back to itself) could never be properly colored, it is understood that graphs in this context are loopless.

The terminology of using colors for vertex labels goes back to map coloring. Labels like red and blue are only used when the number of colors is small, and normally it is understood that the labels are drawn from the integers 

A coloring using at most  colors is called a (proper) -coloring. The smallest number of colors needed to color a graph  is called its chromatic number, and is often denoted .  Sometimes  is used, since  is also used to denote the Euler characteristic of a graph. A graph that can be assigned a (proper) -coloring is  -colorable, and it is -chromatic if its chromatic number is exactly . A subset of vertices assigned to the same color is called a color class, every such class forms an independent set. Thus, a -coloring is the same as a partition of the vertex set into  independent sets, and the terms -partite and -colorable have the same meaning.

Chromatic polynomial

The chromatic polynomial counts the number of ways a graph can be colored using some of a given number of colors. For example, using three colors, the graph in the adjacent image can be colored in 12 ways. With only two colors, it cannot be colored at all. With four colors, it can be colored in 24 + 4⋅12 = 72 ways: using all four colors, there are 4! = 24 valid colorings (every assignment of four colors to any 4-vertex graph is a proper coloring); and for every choice of three of the four colors, there are 12 valid 3-colorings. So, for the graph in the example, a table of the number of valid colorings would start like this:

For the example graph, and indeed .

Indeed,  is the smallest positive integer that is not a zero of the chromatic polynomial

Edge coloring

An edge coloring of a graph is a  proper coloring of the edges, meaning an assignment of colors to edges so that no vertex is incident to two edges of the same color. An edge coloring with  colors is called a -edge-coloring and is equivalent to the problem of partitioning the edge set into  matchings. The smallest number of colors needed for an edge coloring of a graph  is the chromatic index, or edge chromatic number, . A Tait coloring is a 3-edge coloring of a cubic graph. The four color theorem is equivalent to the assertion that every planar cubic bridgeless graph admits a Tait coloring.

Total coloring

Total coloring is a type of coloring on the vertices and edges of a graph. When used without any qualification, a total coloring is always assumed to be proper in the sense that no adjacent vertices, no adjacent edges, and no edge and its end-vertices are assigned the same color.

Unlabeled coloring 
An unlabeled coloring of a graph is an orbit of a coloring under the action of the automorphism group of the graph. Note that the colors remain labeled; it is the graph that is unlabeled.
There is an analogue of the chromatic polynomial which counts the number of unlabeled colorings of a graph from a given finite color set.

Properties

Upper bounds on the chromatic number
Assigning distinct colors to distinct vertices always yields a proper coloring, so

 

The only graphs that can be 1-colored are edgeless graphs. A complete graph  of n vertices requires  colors. In an optimal coloring there must be at least one of the graph's m edges between every pair of color classes, so

 

If G contains a clique of size k, then at least k colors are needed to color that clique; in other words, the chromatic number is at least the clique number:

 

For perfect graphs this bound is tight. Finding cliques is known as the clique problem.

The 2-colorable graphs are exactly the bipartite graphs, including trees and forests.
By the four color theorem, every planar graph can be 4-colored.

A greedy coloring shows that every graph can be colored with one more color than the maximum vertex degree,

 

In all other cases, the bound can be slightly improved; Brooks' theorem states that
 Brooks' theorem:  for a connected, simple graph G, unless G is a complete graph or an odd cycle.

Lower bounds on the chromatic number
Several lower bounds for the chromatic bounds have been discovered over the years:

Then:
 

Define  to be the least k for which such a matrix  exists. Then
 

Lovász number: The Lovász number of a complementary graph is also a lower bound on the chromatic number:
 

Fractional chromatic number: The fractional chromatic number of a graph is a lower bound on the chromatic number as well:
 

These bounds are ordered as follows:

Graphs with high chromatic number
Graphs with large cliques have a high chromatic number, but the opposite is not true. The Grötzsch graph is an example of a 4-chromatic graph without a triangle, and the example can be generalized to the Mycielskians.
 Theorem: There exist triangle-free graphs with arbitrarily high chromatic number.

To prove this, both, Mycielski and Zykov, each gave a construction of an inductively defined family of triangle-free graphs but with arbitrarily large chromatic number. Burling (1965) constructed axis aligned boxes in  whose intersection graph is triangle-free and requires arbitrarily many colors to be properly colored. This family of graphs is then called the Burling graphs. The same class of graphs is used for the construction of a family of triangle-free line segments in the plane, given by Pawlik et al. (2014). It shows that the chromatic number of its intersection graph is arbitrarily large as well.

From Brooks's theorem, graphs with high chromatic number must have high maximum degree. But colorability is not an entirely local phenomenon: A graph with high girth looks locally like a tree, because all cycles are long, but its chromatic number need not be 2:
Theorem (Erdős): There exist graphs of arbitrarily high girth and chromatic number.

Bounds on the chromatic index
An edge coloring of G is a vertex coloring of its line graph , and vice versa. Thus,

There is a strong relationship between edge colorability and the graph's maximum degree . Since all edges incident to the same vertex need their own color, we have

 

Moreover,

 Kőnig's theorem:  if G is bipartite.

In general, the relationship is even stronger than what Brooks's theorem gives for vertex coloring:

Other properties
A graph has a k-coloring if and only if it has an acyclic orientation for which the longest path has length at most k; this is the Gallai–Hasse–Roy–Vitaver theorem .

For planar graphs, vertex colorings are essentially dual to nowhere-zero flows.

About infinite graphs, much less is known.
The following are two of the few results about infinite graph coloring:
If all finite subgraphs of an infinite graph G are k-colorable, then so is G, under the assumption of the axiom of choice.
If a graph admits a full n-coloring for every n ≥ n0, it admits an infinite full coloring .

Open problems
As stated above,  A conjecture of Reed from 1998 is that the value is essentially closer to the lower bound, 

The chromatic number of the plane, where two points are adjacent if they have unit distance, is unknown, although it is one of 5, 6, or 7. Other open problems concerning the chromatic number of graphs include the Hadwiger conjecture stating that every graph with chromatic number k has a complete graph on k vertices as a minor, the Erdős–Faber–Lovász conjecture bounding the chromatic number of unions of complete graphs that have at most one vertex in common to each pair, and the Albertson conjecture that among k-chromatic graphs the complete graphs are the ones with smallest crossing number.

When Birkhoff and Lewis introduced the chromatic polynomial in their attack on the four-color theorem, they conjectured that for planar graphs G, the polynomial  has no zeros in the region . Although it is known that such a chromatic polynomial has no zeros in the region  and that , their conjecture is still unresolved. It also remains an unsolved problem to characterize graphs which have the same chromatic polynomial and to determine which polynomials are chromatic.

Algorithms

Polynomial time
Determining if a graph can be colored with 2 colors is equivalent to determining whether or not the graph is bipartite, and thus computable in linear time using breadth-first search or depth-first search. More generally, the chromatic number and a corresponding coloring of  perfect graphs can be computed in polynomial time using semidefinite programming. Closed formulas for chromatic polynomials are known for many classes of graphs, such as forests, chordal graphs, cycles, wheels, and ladders, so these can be evaluated in polynomial time.

If the graph is planar and has low branch-width (or is nonplanar but with a known branch decomposition), then it can be solved in polynomial time using dynamic programming. In general, the time required is polynomial in the graph size, but exponential in the branch-width.

Exact algorithms
Brute-force search for a k-coloring considers each of the  assignments of k colors to n vertices and checks for each if it is legal. To compute the chromatic number and the chromatic polynomial, this procedure is used for every , impractical for all but the smallest input graphs.

Using dynamic programming and a bound on the number of maximal independent sets, k-colorability can be decided in time and space . Using the principle of inclusion–exclusion and Yates's algorithm for the fast zeta transform, k-colorability can be decided in time  for any k. Exponentially faster algorithms are also known for 5- and 6-colorability, as well as for restricted families of graphs, including sparse graphs.

Contraction
The  contraction  of a graph G is the graph obtained by identifying the vertices u and v, and removing any edges between them. The remaining edges originally incident to u or v are now incident to their identification (i.e., the new fused node uv). This operation plays a major role in the analysis of graph coloring.

The chromatic number satisfies the recurrence relation:

Several algorithms are based on evaluating this recurrence and the resulting computation tree is sometimes called a Zykov tree. The running time is based on a heuristic for choosing the vertices u and v.

The chromatic polynomial satisfies the following recurrence relation

Then the proper colorings arise from two different graphs. To explain, if the vertices u and v have different colors, then we might as well consider a graph where u and v are adjacent. If u and v have the same colors, we might as well consider a graph where u and v are contracted. Tutte's curiosity about which other graph properties satisfied this recurrence led him to discover a bivariate generalization of the chromatic polynomial, the Tutte polynomial.

These expressions give rise to a recursive procedure called the deletion–contraction algorithm, which forms the basis of many algorithms for graph coloring. The analysis can be improved to within a polynomial factor of the number  of spanning trees of the input graph. In practice, branch and bound strategies and graph isomorphism rejection are employed to avoid some recursive calls. The running time depends on the heuristic used to pick the vertex pair.

Greedy coloring

The  greedy algorithm considers the vertices in a specific order ,…, and assigns to   the smallest available color not used by 's neighbours among ,…,, adding a fresh color if needed. The quality of the resulting coloring depends on the chosen ordering. There exists an ordering that leads to a greedy coloring with the optimal number of  colors. On the other hand, greedy colorings can be arbitrarily bad; for example, the crown graph on n vertices  can be 2-colored, but has an ordering that leads to a greedy coloring with  colors.

For chordal graphs, and for special cases of chordal graphs such as interval graphs and indifference graphs, the greedy coloring algorithm can be used to find optimal colorings in polynomial time, by choosing the vertex ordering to be the reverse of a perfect elimination ordering for the graph. The perfectly orderable graphs generalize this property, but it is NP-hard to find a perfect ordering of these graphs.

If the vertices are ordered according to their degrees, the resulting greedy coloring uses at most  colors, at most one more than the graph's maximum degree. This heuristic is sometimes called the  Welsh–Powell algorithm. Another heuristic due to Brélaz establishes the ordering dynamically while the algorithm proceeds, choosing next  the vertex adjacent to the largest number of different colors. Many other graph coloring heuristics are similarly based on greedy coloring for a specific static or dynamic strategy of ordering the vertices, these algorithms are sometimes called sequential coloring algorithms.

The maximum (worst) number of colors that can be obtained by the greedy algorithm, by using a vertex ordering chosen to maximize this number, is called the Grundy number of a graph.

Heuristic algorithms
Two well-known polynomial-time heuristics for graph colouring are the DSatur and recursive largest first (RLF) algorithms.

Similarly to the greedy colouring algorithm, DSatur colours the vertices of a graph one after another, expending a previously unused colour when needed. Once a new vertex has been coloured, the algorithm determines which of the remaining uncoloured vertices has the highest number of different colours in its neighbourhood and colours this vertex next. This is defined as the degree of saturation of a given vertex.

The recursive largest first algorithm operates in a different fashion by constructing each color class one at a time. It does this by identifying a maximal independent set of vertices in the graph using specialised heuristic rules. It then assigns these vertices to the same color and removes them from the graph. These actions are repeated on the remaining subgraph until no vertices remain.

The algorithm can also be implemented using a binary heap to store saturation degrees, operating in  where  is the number of edges in the graph. This produces much faster runs with sparse graphs.

DSatur and RLF are exact for bipartite, cycle, and wheel graphs.

Parallel and distributed algorithms

In the field of distributed algorithms, graph coloring is closely related to the problem of symmetry breaking.  The current state-of-the-art randomized algorithms are faster for sufficiently large maximum degree Δ than deterministic algorithms. The fastest randomized algorithms employ the multi-trials technique by Schneider et al.

In a symmetric graph, a deterministic distributed algorithm cannot find a proper vertex coloring. Some auxiliary information is needed in order to break symmetry. A standard assumption is that initially each node has a unique identifier, for example, from the set {1, 2, ..., n}. Put otherwise, we assume that we are given an n-coloring. The challenge is to reduce the number of colors from n to, e.g., Δ + 1. The more colors are employed, e.g. O(Δ) instead of Δ + 1, the fewer communication rounds are required.

A straightforward distributed version of the greedy algorithm for (Δ + 1)-coloring requires Θ(n) communication rounds in the worst case − information may need to be propagated from one side of the network to another side.

The simplest interesting case is an n-cycle. Richard Cole and Uzi Vishkin show that there is a distributed algorithm that reduces the number of colors from n to O(log n) in one synchronous communication step. By iterating the same procedure, it is possible to obtain a 3-coloring of an n-cycle in O( n) communication steps (assuming that we have unique node identifiers).

The function , iterated logarithm, is an extremely slowly growing function, "almost constant". Hence the result by Cole and Vishkin raised the question of whether there is a constant-time distributed algorithm for 3-coloring an n-cycle.  showed that this is not possible: any deterministic distributed algorithm requires Ω( n) communication steps to reduce an n-coloring to a 3-coloring in an n-cycle.

The technique by Cole and Vishkin can be applied in arbitrary bounded-degree graphs as well; the running time is poly(Δ) + O( n). The technique was extended to unit disk graphs by Schneider et al. The fastest deterministic algorithms for (Δ + 1)-coloring for small Δ are due to Leonid Barenboim, Michael Elkin and Fabian Kuhn. The algorithm by Barenboim et al. runs in time O(Δ) + (n)/2, which is optimal in terms of n since the constant factor 1/2 cannot be improved due to Linial's lower bound.  use network decompositions to compute a Δ+1 coloring in time .

The problem of edge coloring has also been studied in the distributed model.  achieve a (2Δ − 1)-coloring in O(Δ +  n) time in this model. The lower bound for distributed vertex coloring due to  applies to the distributed edge coloring problem as well.

Decentralized algorithms
Decentralized algorithms are ones where no message passing is allowed (in contrast to distributed algorithms where local message passing takes places), and efficient decentralized algorithms exist that will color a graph if a proper coloring exists.  These assume that a vertex is able to sense whether any of its neighbors are using the same color as the vertex i.e., whether a local conflict exists.  This is a mild assumption in many applications e.g. in wireless channel allocation it is usually reasonable to assume that a station will be able to detect whether other interfering transmitters are using the same channel (e.g. by measuring the SINR).  This sensing information is sufficient to allow algorithms based on learning automata to find a proper graph coloring with probability one.

Computational complexity
Graph coloring is computationally hard. It is NP-complete to decide if a given graph admits a k-coloring for a given k except for the cases  k ∈ {0,1,2} .    In particular, it is NP-hard to compute the chromatic number. The 3-coloring problem remains NP-complete even on 4-regular planar graphs. On graphs with maximal degree 3 or less, however, Brooks' theorem implies that the 3-coloring problem can be solved in linear time. Further, for every k > 3, a k-coloring of a planar graph exists by the four color theorem, and it is possible to find such a coloring in polynomial time.

The best known approximation algorithm computes a coloring of size at most within a factor O(n(log log n)2(log n)−3) of the chromatic number. For all ε > 0, approximating the chromatic number within n1−ε is NP-hard.

It is also NP-hard to color a 3-colorable graph with 4 colors and a k-colorable graph with k(log k ) / 25 colors for sufficiently large constant k.

Computing the coefficients of the chromatic polynomial is #P-hard. There is no FPRAS for evaluating the chromatic polynomial at any rational point k ≥ 1.5 except for k = 2 unless NP = RP.

For edge coloring, the proof of Vizing's result gives an algorithm that uses at most Δ+1 colors. However, deciding between the two candidate values for the edge chromatic number is NP-complete. In terms of approximation algorithms, Vizing's algorithm shows that the edge chromatic number can be approximated to within 4/3,
and the hardness result shows that no (4/3 − ε )-algorithm exists for any ε > 0 unless P = NP. These are among the oldest results in the literature of approximation algorithms, even though neither paper makes explicit use of that notion.

Applications

Scheduling

Vertex coloring models to a number of scheduling problems. In the cleanest form, a given set of jobs need to be assigned to time slots, each job requires one such slot. Jobs can be scheduled in any order, but pairs of jobs may be in conflict in the sense that they may not be assigned to the same time slot, for example because they both rely on a shared resource. The corresponding graph contains a vertex for every job and an edge for every conflicting pair of jobs. The chromatic number of the graph is exactly the minimum makespan, the optimal time to finish all jobs without conflicts.

Details of the scheduling problem define the structure of the graph. For example, when assigning aircraft to flights, the resulting conflict graph is an interval graph, so the coloring problem can be solved efficiently. In bandwidth allocation to radio stations, the resulting conflict graph is a unit disk graph, so the coloring problem is 3-approximable.

Register allocation

A compiler is a computer program that translates one computer language into another. To improve the execution time of the resulting code, one of the techniques of compiler optimization is register allocation, where the most frequently used values of the compiled program are kept in the fast processor registers. Ideally, values are assigned to registers so that they can all reside in the registers when they are used.

The textbook approach to this problem is to model it as a graph coloring problem. The compiler constructs an  interference graph, where vertices are variables and an edge connects two vertices if they are needed at the same time. If the graph can be colored with k colors then any set of variables needed at the same time can be stored in at most k registers.

Other applications

The problem of coloring a graph arises in many practical areas such as pattern matching, sports scheduling, designing seating plans, exam timetabling, the scheduling of  taxis, and solving Sudoku puzzles.

Other colorings

Ramsey theory

An important class of improper coloring problems is studied in Ramsey theory, where the graph's edges are assigned to colors, and there is no restriction on the colors of incident edges. Ramsey theory is concerned with generalisations of this idea to seek regularity amid disorder, finding general conditions for the existence of monochromatic subgraphs with given structure.

Other colorings

 Adjacent-vertex-distinguishing-total coloring  A total coloring with the additional restriction that any two adjacent vertices have different color sets
 Acyclic coloring  Every 2-chromatic subgraph is acyclic
 B-coloring  a coloring of the vertices where each color class contains a vertex that has a neighbor in all other color classes.
 Circular coloring  Motivated by task systems in which production proceeds in a cyclic way
 Cocoloring  An improper vertex coloring where every color class induces an independent set or a clique
 Complete coloring  Every pair of colors appears on at least one edge
 Defective coloring  An improper vertex coloring where every color class induces a bounded degree subgraph.
 Distinguishing coloring  An improper vertex coloring that destroys all the symmetries of the graph
 Equitable coloring  The sizes of color classes differ by at most one
 Exact coloring  Every pair of colors appears on exactly one edge
 Fractional coloring  Vertices may have multiple colors, and on each edge the sum of the color parts of each vertex is not greater than one
 Hamiltonian coloring  Uses the length of the longest path between two vertices, also known as the detour distance
 Harmonious coloring  Every pair of colors appears on at most one edge
 Incidence coloring Each adjacent incidence of vertex and edge is colored with distinct colors
 Interval edge coloring  A color of edges meeting in a common vertex must be contiguous
 List coloring Each vertex chooses from a list of colors
 List edge-coloringEach edge chooses from a list of colors
 L(h, k)-coloring Difference of colors at adjacent vertices is at least h and difference of colors of vertices at a distance two is at least k. A particular case is L(2,1)-coloring.

  Oriented coloring  Takes into account orientation of edges of the graph
  Path coloring  Models a routing problem in graphs
 Radio coloring  Sum of the distance between the vertices and the difference of their colors is greater than k+1, where k is a positive integer.
 Rank coloring  If two vertices have the same color i, then every path between them contain a vertex with color greater than i
 Subcoloring  An improper vertex coloring where every color class induces a union of cliques
 Sum coloring  The criterion of minimalization is the sum of colors
 Star coloring  Every 2-chromatic subgraph is a disjoint collection of stars
 Strong coloring  Every color appears in every partition of equal size exactly once
 Strong edge coloring  Edges are colored such that each color class induces a matching (equivalent to coloring the square of the line graph)
 T-coloring  Absolute value of the difference between two colors of adjacent vertices must not belong to fixed set T
 Total coloring Vertices and edges are colored
 Centered coloring Every connected induced subgraph has a color that is used exactly once
 Triangle-free edge coloring The edges are colored so that each color class forms a triangle-free subgraph
 Weak coloring  An improper vertex coloring where every non-isolated node has at least one neighbor with a different color

Coloring can also be considered for signed graphs and gain graphs.

See also 
 Critical graph
 Graph coloring game
 Graph homomorphism
 Hajós construction
 Mathematics of Sudoku
 Multipartite graph
 Uniquely colorable graph

Notes

References 

 
 
 
 
 
  (= Indag. Math. 13)
 

 
 
 
 
 
 
 

 
 
 
 
 
 
 
 
 
 
 
 
  
 
 
 
 
 
 
 
 
.
.

 
 
 
 
 
 
 
  
 
 . Translated into English in Amer. Math. Soc. Translation, 1952, .

External links 

 High-Performance Graph Colouring Algorithms Suite of 8 different algorithms (implemented in C++) used in the book A Guide to Graph Colouring: Algorithms and Applications (Springer International Publishers, 2015).
 Graph Coloring Page by Joseph Culberson (graph coloring programs)
 CoLoRaTiOn by Jim Andrews and Mike Fellows is a graph coloring puzzle
 Links to Graph Coloring source codes
 Code for efficiently computing Tutte, Chromatic and Flow Polynomials  by Gary Haggard, David J. Pearce and Gordon Royle
 A graph coloring Web App by Jose Antonio Martin H.

 
Coloring
NP-complete problems
NP-hard problems
Computational problems in graph theory
Extensions and generalizations of graphs